Barkichampi station, station code BICI, is the railway station in lohardaga district which connects Lohardaga and Tori of Jharkhand. Barkichampi station belongs to the  Ranchi division of the South Eastern Railway zone of the Indian Railways.

History

The  railway track was converted from narrow gauge (2'6") to broad gauge in 2005.  The track is planned to be extended 44 km more to connect with Tori railway station in Chandwa town in Latehar district.  This would reduce the railway distance between Ranchi and Delhi and the railway travel time by three hours.  However the construction of a tunnel under the hill between Lohardaga and Tori has not been completed even in a decade.  The track has been laid only for 14 km from Lohardaga to Barkichampi and laying of the track on the remaining 30 km running through dense forests has been delayed by terrorist activities of maoists.

Medininagar|Medininagar block

Facilities 
The major facilities available are waiting rooms, retiring room, computerized reservation facility, reservation counter, vehicle parking etc. The vehicles are allowed to enter the station premises. Security personnel from the Government Railway Police (G.R.P.) are present for security.

Platforms
The platforms  are interconnected with foot overbridge (FOB).

Trains 
Several local passenger trains also run from Lohardaga to neighbouring destinations on frequent intervals. 

/* Train

Nearest airport
The nearest airport to Barkichampi station are:

Birsa Munda Airport, Ranchi  
Gaya Airport, Gaya 
Lok Nayak Jayaprakash Airport, Patna 
Netaji Subhash Chandra Bose International Airport, Kolkata

See also 

 Lohardaga
 Lohardaga railway station

References

External links 
 Lohardaga station map
 Official website of the Lohardaga district

Railway stations in Lohardaga district
Ranchi railway division